Little Muddy River may refer to the following rivers in U.S.A.:
Little Muddy River (Illinois)
Little Muddy River (North Dakota)